Cyclohexadecanone is an organic compound with the formula (CH2)15CO.  It is a cyclic ketone, which is a minor component of the musk scent of the civet.  Several related derivatives are also important in the fragrance industry, especially those with alkene group in the backbone such as civetone, muscone, and 5-cyclohexadecenone (velvione). It is synthesized from cyclododecanone.

References

Perfume ingredients
Macrocycles
Mammalian pheromones
Cycloalkanones